The Miami Beach Flamingos were a professional minor league baseball team based in Miami Beach, Florida  periodically from 1940 until 1954.

The team played its home games at Flamingo Field and was a member of the Class D Florida East Coast League as the Miami Beach Tigers in 1940. The following season they changed their nickname to the Flamingos and won the league's championship. The FECL the then folded in May 1942 due to World War II. After the War, the Flamingos joined the new Class C Florida International League in 1946. The league became Class-B in 1949.  The Flamingos played the 1952 season, sat-out 1953, and rejoined in 1954 only to move across Biscayne Bay and relocate to Miami as the Miami Beach Flamingos/Greater Miami Flamingos during the 1954 season.

Notable alumni
Gene Bearden
Jack Brittin
Harry Chozen
Jim Clark
Bill Currie
Hooks Iott
Jesse Levan
Minnie Mendoza
Danny Morejon
Baby Ortiz
Jimmy Outlaw
Jack Phillips
Whitey Platt
Max Rosenfeld
Mike Schemer

References

Defunct minor league baseball teams
Defunct baseball teams in Florida
Baseball teams disestablished in 1954
Baseball teams established in 1940
1940 establishments in Florida
1954 disestablishments in Florida
Baseball teams in Miami
Boston Braves minor league affiliates